Thuret can refer to a few different people or places:

 Gustave Thuret (1817–1875), a French botanist
 Jardin botanique de la Villa Thuret, a botanic garden founded by Gustave Thuret
 Thuret, Puy-de-Dôme, a French commune
 Thuret family of clockmakers including:
Isaac II Thuret (1630–1706), parent
Jacques III Thuret (1669–1738), child